Rosalyn Diprose is Emeritus Professor of philosophy at University of New South Wales.

A graduate of the University of Technology Sydney, The University of Sydney and UNSW Sydney, she is known for her research on ethics, embodiment, generosity and cultural difference.

See also
Biopolitics
Gender performativity

Bibliography
 Rosalyn Diprose and Jack Reynolds (eds.), Merleau-Ponty: Key Concepts, Acumen, 2008, 
 Diprose, Rosalyn, Corporeal Generosity: On Giving with Nietzsche, Merleau-Ponty, and Levinas, SUNY, 2002, 
 Diprose, Rosalyn, The Bodies of Women: Ethics, Embodiment and Sexual Difference, Routledge, London, 1994

References

External links
 

20th-century Australian philosophers
21st-century Australian philosophers
University at Buffalo faculty
Academic staff of the University of New South Wales
Academics of the Open University
Continental philosophers
Living people
Political philosophers
Phenomenologists
Heidegger scholars
Gender studies academics
University of Technology Sydney alumni
University of New South Wales alumni
University of Sydney alumni
Year of birth missing (living people)
Australian women philosophers